Trinity College Boat Club (TCBC) is the rowing club of Trinity College, Oxford in Oxford, United Kingdom.  The club's members are students and staff from Trinity College and, occasionally, associate members from other colleges.

The boat club is based in its boathouse on the Isis, which is shared with Lady Margaret Hall Boat Club (LMHBC), Linacre College Boat Club and Magdalen College Boat Club.

History

Rowing as an organised inter-collegiate sport became increasingly popular in Oxford during the early decades of the nineteenth century; the first organised bumps races was held at around that time. A Trinity rower in 1831 by the name of James Pycroft detailed how the men in the crew would pay for a college boat themselves, and would levy a rate upon all members of the college to help pay for it, "it being considered that the boat and its anticipated victories were for the honour of the college generally". Even at the outset of rowing at Trinity in the 1830s, Pycroft records in his memoirs an incident in which a scholar named Thomas Lewin "had thoughts of joining the boat, but received a hint that it would not do"; because members of the boat club were known to be uproarious, riotous and generally interested in having a good time while they studied.

In 1838 Trinity join the records, which can still be seen in the college's boathouse, and moved up three places over the week's rowing from eighth to fifth. Trinity's first rowing Blues are both depicted in the earliest known depiction of a Trinity crew, from 1842. John Cox and Edward Breedon both rowed in the sixth boat race on the Westminster to Putney course in 1842.

Another nineteen years passed with rowing at Trinity growing in its importance within the college, until finally during the Eights in 1861, Trinity bumped University College, Brasenose College, Exeter and finally Balliol College to go Head of the River. The run of great rowing continued until 1865, which marked the beginning of a disastrous few years of racing at Trinity. However, the period at the head was matched with a similar stretch of dominance at the top of Division One, just a few months before the start of World War II in 1939. Several of Trinity's former members rowed at that time and experienced being the best of the Oxford college crews on the Isis.

In addition to this, past Trinity crews were involved in many regattas outside of the college, including the Henley Royal Regatta and the Thames Regatta.

Results
Men's Summer Eights Headship: 1861–64, 1938, 1939, 1946–49
Men's Summer Eights Spoons: 2016
Henley Royal Regatta Stewards' Challenge Cup: 1949
Henley Royal Regatta Silver Goblets & Nickalls' Challenge Cup : 1923
Henley Royal Regatta Ladies' Challenge Plate : 1923
Henley Royal Regatta Thames Challenge Cup : 1894, 1898
Henley Royal Regatta Wyfold Challenge Cup : 1896, 1928
Henley Royal Regatta Visitors' Challenge Cup : 1895, 1897,

Equipment

Fleet

2019 Hudson 8+ "De Jagerbomb" 
2014 Filippi 8+ "Spirit of Myrtle"
2008 Empacher 8+   "Parni"
2008 Stampfli 8+ "Magnificat"
2008 Stampfli 4+ 
2003 Janousek 4+  "Judith Beloff"
2000 Sims 8+     "Lady Elizabeth"
c.1990 Janousek 8+ "Richard Hillary"

Blues

See also
 Oxford University Rowing Clubs

References

External links

Rowing clubs of the University of Oxford
Trinity College, Oxford
1837 establishments in England
Rowing clubs in Oxfordshire
Rowing clubs of the River Thames